Maltby le Marsh is a village and civil parish in the East Lindsey district of Lincolnshire, England. The village is situated between Alford and Mablethorpe, and at the junction of the A1104 and A157 roads.

Maltby le Marsh contains a shop, newsagent, post office, and service station, the Crown Inn  and Turks Head public houses, and Oham (fishing) Lake.

Maltby le Marsh tower mill is disused, with sails removed, but the brick base survives. All trace of a previous post mill has disappeared.

Previously there existed a 12th-century Anglican church, a Baptist chapel and a Methodist chapel. The Anglican church is disused – the village shares the church at Beesby. The Baptist chapel has been converted to a house, and the Methodist to the village hall, which is shared with Strubby and Beesby.

References

External links

Maltby le Marsh website
Maltby le Marsh windmill
Location map of Maltby le Marsh
Aerial view of Maltby le Marsh

Villages in Lincolnshire
Civil parishes in Lincolnshire
East Lindsey District